Dami Àjàyí (born 1986) is a Nigerian poet, medical doctor, essayist and music critic. He co-founded Saraba magazine in 2008. He is the author of two collections of poetry and a chapbook.

Biography 

Dami Àjàyí was born in Nigeria in 1986. While he was an undergraduate of medicine at the Obafemi Awolowo University in Ile-Ife, he co-founded Saraba Magazine with another student. He also cofounded media outlets The Lagos Review and YabaLeft Review, with writers Toni Kan and Tunji Olalere respectively.

Àjàyí was featured in the two-part BBC Radio 4 documentary Writing a New Nigeria.

Poetry 
In 2011, Àjàyí was listed among the "Eight Young Nigerian Poets Whose Poems Delight" on the Sentinel UK Poetry Blog. His first collection of poems, Clinical Blues, was shortlisted (in manuscript form) for the Melita Hume Prize in 2012. It was published by WriteHouse in 2014, and was longlisted for the biennial Wole Soyinka Prize for Literature in Africa. 

In 2017, his second collection of poetry, A Woman's Body is a Country, was published by Ouida Books). Of the work, Àjàyí says: "I wanted my book to show how the noun 'affection' becomes a verb, and in my attempt I was drawing from a personal reservoir, hoping that my experiences are singular as well as universal." He has been described as one who "writes about love like liquor that drowns a person into his or her feelings."

Prose and criticism 
Àjàyí has written short stories that have been published in Nigeria and abroad. He currently provides critical reviews about Nigerian music to a number of online publications.

He was also one of the editors of the anthology From Limbe to Lagos : NonFiction from Cameroon and Nigeria, which was the result of a writing workshop held in Limbe for young African writers.

Books 
 Clinical Blues (2014)
 A Woman's Body is a Country (2017)

References 

1986 births
Living people
21st-century Nigerian poets
Nigerian editors
Nigerian male poets
Obafemi Awolowo University alumni
Yoruba poets